.swiss is a top-level domain (TLD) for Switzerland. It was approved by ICANN as a TLD on 16 Oct 2014. This is meant to supplement the traditional .ch TLD.

The Federal Office of Communications (OFCOM) began registering .swiss domains as of 7 September 2015. Open registration to other legal entities begins from 11 January 2016.

Accredited registrars
As of December 6, 2016.

 101domain, Inc.
 1API GmbH
 Ascio Technologies Inc. Danmark – filial of Ascio Technologies Inc. USA
 BB Online
 Crazy Domains FZ-LLC
 COREhub S.R.L.
 CPS-Datensysteme GmbH
 CSC Corporate Domain, Inc.
 EuroDNS S.A.
 GANDI SAS
 Hosteur Sàrl
 Hosting Concepts dba Openprovider
 Infomaniak
 Hostpoint AG
 iNIC GmbH
 InterNetworX Ltd. & Co. KG
 Instra Corporation Pty Ltd
 Key-Systems LLC
 Lexsynergy Limited
 Marcaria (company)
 MarkMonitor Inc.
 NAMESHIELD S.A.S.
 Name Web BVBA
 NETIM
 NetZone AG
 Nom-IQ Ltd. dba Com Laude
 OVH SAS
 PSI-USA, Inc./InterNetX GmbH
 RegistryGate
 SafeBrands
 Safenames Limited
 Secura GmbH
 Switchplus AG
 Vautron Rechenzentrum AG

See also

 .ch

References

Swiss
Communications in Switzerland
Internet in Switzerland
Computer-related introductions in 2014